The 2003 US Open was held between August 25 – September 7, 2003.

Both Pete Sampras and Serena Williams did not defend their titles from 2002; Sampras unofficially retired after winning his final Grand Slam title the previous year, and Serena Williams was forced to miss the tournament after withdrawing through injury. This was the first time since 1971 in which neither champion was able to defend their title.

Andy Roddick, who previously won the 2000 US Open as a junior, won his only Grand Slam title, defeating Juan Carlos Ferrero (who inherited the World No.1 ranking after the tournament) in the final. Justine Henin-Hardenne won her first US Open title and second Grand Slam title, defeating her compatriot, rival and future three-times US Open champion Kim Clijsters in the final, dropping only one set through her run.

Seniors

Men's singles

 Andy Roddick defeated  Juan Carlos Ferrero, 6–3, 7–6(7–2), 6–3
• It was Roddick's 1st and only career Grand Slam singles title. It was Roddick's 6th title of the year, and his 11th overall.

Women's singles

 Justine Henin-Hardenne defeated  Kim Clijsters, 7–5, 6–1
• It was Henin-Hardenne's 2nd career Grand Slam singles title and her 1st title at the US Open. It was Henin-Hardenne's 7th title of the year, and her 13th overall. She became the first Belgian tennis player to win the US Open singles crown.

Men's doubles

 Jonas Björkman /  Todd Woodbridge defeated  Mike Bryan /  Bob Bryan, 5–7, 6–0, 7–5
• It was Björkman's 6th career Grand Slam doubles title and his 1st and only title at the US Open.
• It was Woodbridge's 15th career Grand Slam doubles title and his 3rd and last title at the US Open.

Women's doubles

 Virginia Ruano Pascual /  Paola Suárez defeated  Svetlana Kuznetsova /  Martina Navratilova, 6–2, 6–2
• It was Ruano Pascual's 4th career Grand Slam doubles title and her 2nd title at the US Open.
• It was Suárez' 4th career Grand Slam doubles title and her 2nd title at the US Open.

Mixed doubles

 Katarina Srebotnik /  Bob Bryan defeated  Lina Krasnoroutskaya /  Daniel Nestor, 5–7, 7–5, 7–6(7–5)
• It was Srebotnik's 2nd career Grand Slam mixed doubles title and her 1st and only title at the US Open.
• It was Bryan's 1st career Grand Slam mixed doubles title.

Juniors

Boys' singles

 Jo-Wilfried Tsonga defeated  Marcos Baghdatis, 7–6, 6–3

Girls' singles

 Kirsten Flipkens defeated  Michaëlla Krajicek, 6–3, 7–5

Boys' doubles
Not played due to inclement weather.

Girls' doubles
Not played due to inclement weather.

References

External links
 Official US Open website

 
 

 
US Open
2003
US Open
US Open
US Open